Pablo Júnior Giménez (born 29 June 1981) is a Paraguayan former professional footballer who played as a forward.

He was part of the silver medal-winning Paraguayan football team at the 2004 Summer Olympics which lost to Argentina in the final.

International career
On 4 August, before the Summer Olympics began, he played in a preparation game against the Portugal of Cristiano Ronaldo in the city of Algarve, resulting in a 5–0 defeat.

References

1981 births
Living people
People from Cordillera Department
Association football forwards
Paraguayan footballers
Club Guaraní players
Clube Atlético Mineiro players
Cerro Porteño players
Quilmes Atlético Club footballers
Querétaro F.C. footballers
Club Olimpia footballers
Deportes Tolima footballers
Sportivo Luqueño players
Paraguay international footballers
Olympic footballers of Paraguay
Footballers at the 2004 Summer Olympics
Olympic silver medalists for Paraguay
Expatriate footballers in Argentina
Expatriate footballers in Brazil
Expatriate footballers in Chile
Paraguayan expatriates in Chile
Paraguayan expatriates in Brazil
Paraguayan expatriate sportspeople in Argentina
Olympic medalists in football
Medalists at the 2004 Summer Olympics